KIF1-binding protein, also known as Kinesin binding protein(KBP), is a protein that in humans is encoded by the KIAA1279 gene. The interaction of KBP with Kif15 is necessary for the localization of Kif15 to the microtubule plus-end at the spindle equator. Interaction between Kif15 and KBP is essential for the perfect alignment of chromosomes at the metaphase plate, and any defect in their interaction leads to delay in chromosomal alignment during mitosis. Anything that perturb the interaction of KBP and Kif15 can block the cells at mitosis, and hence it can be therapeutically used to control Kif15 upregulated cancer cells.

Clinical significance 

Defects may be associated with Goldberg–Shprintzen syndrome (OMIM 609460).

Interactions 

KIAA1279 has been shown to interact with Retinal G protein coupled receptor and Dipeptidase 1.

References

Further reading

External links 
  Online Mendelian Inheritance in Man entry on GOLDBERG-SHPRINTZEN MEGACOLON SYNDROME